Djibrine Kherallah (1926 – 21 October 2001) was a Chadian Muslim politician and diplomat. He served as minister of finance and foreign affairs in 1960s and 1970s.

References

1926 births
2001 deaths
Chadian diplomats
Chadian Muslims
Finance ministers of Chad
Foreign ministers of Chad